The Apollo Theatre in Martinsburg, West Virginia was designed by architect Reginald Geare with local architect Chapman E. Kent, and built in 1913 by theater owner H. P. Thorn.  As constructed it had a seating capacity of 1000, and was used for movies, vaudeville and concerts. Upper floors provided meeting spaces for large groups.

The Apollo Theatre is operated as a community-supported facility. It was listed on the National Register of Historic Places in 1979. It is included in the Downtown Martinsburg Historic District.

References

Buildings and structures in Martinsburg, West Virginia
National Register of Historic Places in Martinsburg, West Virginia
Theatres completed in 1913
Theatres on the National Register of Historic Places in West Virginia
1913 establishments in West Virginia
Individually listed contributing properties to historic districts on the National Register in West Virginia